Scott Lucas is the name of:

Scott W. Lucas (1892–1968), U.S. Senator and Senate Majority Leader from Illinois
Scott Lucas (footballer) (born 1977), Australian footballer
Scott Lucas (musician) (born 1970), founding member of Local H
Professor Scott Lucas, UK-based political science scholar and editor of EA WorldView